Alan Randall may refer to:
 Alan Randall (footballer)
 Alan Randall (entertainer)